Bdelloidea is a superfamily of mites, containing the two families Bdellidae and Cunaxidae. It should not be confused with the rotifer superfamily of the same name.

References

Trombidiformes
Articles containing video clips